Theocharis 'Charis' Tsingaras (born 20 August 2000) is a Greek professional footballer who plays as a midfielder for Ligue 1 club Toulouse, on loan from PAOK.

Career

Early career
As a child, Tsingaras thought of the journey as a normal everyday part of his life. "It was tedious and I did not always find the time I wanted to study, but I stole some hours to read on the bus from home to school", he recalled. The busy and stressful training program never stopped him from being consistent at school. Always a good student, he also enrolled in the School of Management, Economics and Communication. Since joining PAOK in 2010, Tsingaras, born on 20 August 2000, opted to make the PAOK Academy house his home after years of clocking up the kilometers with his road trips.

Tsiggaras was and is a disciplined and persistent character. A smart and extremely capable defensive midfielder, he is able to help his team in both defence and attack. A humble and hard worker in training as well as on the pitch, he quickly found his way to his dream. One of the influential figures in the Under-15 title-winning side of the 2014–15 season, and a champion in the 2015–16 season with the Under-17s, he also won the title with the Under-19s in three consecutive seasons (2017–18, 2018–19, 2019–20). He was also a key player during the UEFA Youth League campaigns, and of course has represented Greece at every youth level.

PAOK
In the summer of 2019, he joined up with the first team squad for pre-season training, and played in the friendly against PEC Zwolle, and continued to work with consistency and patience, but also with an obvious development, which did not go unnoticed by former coach Abel Ferreira during the 2020 pre-season. He played for the senior side for the first time in June 2020 against Aris, coming off the bench in the 86th minute.Some details on the procedure separate Theocharis Tsingaras from the renewal of his contract with PAOK, something that was now considered certain that will happen. According to a LiveSport article, the two sides have talked and agreed on the 20-year-old midfielder staying in Toumba, and only the signatures remain. However, the details of the deal are not yet known. The matter is expected to be closed immediately and the young midfielder will be invited to sign his new contract and everything shows that he will get some opportunities from Abel Ferreira.

Personal life
Tsingaras' older brother, Angelos, is also a professional footballer.

Career statistics

Club

Honours
PAOK
Greek Cup: 2018–19, 2020–21; runner-up 2021–22

References

External links
 

2000 births
Living people
Greek footballers
Footballers from Moudania
Association football midfielders
Greece under-21 international footballers
Greece youth international footballers
Super League Greece players
Ligue 1 players
PAOK FC players
Toulouse FC players
Greek expatriate footballers
Greek expatriate sportspeople in France
Expatriate footballers in France